Cinema Vox may refer to:

 Cinema Vox (Casablanca), a former cinema in Casablanca, Morocco.
 Cinema Vox (Tangier), a former cinema in Tangier, Morocco.